Ishfaq Ahmad is a computer scientist, IEEE Fellow and Professor of Computer Science and Engineering at the University of Texas at Arlington (UTA). He is the Director of the Center For Advanced Computing Systems (CACS) and has previously directed IRIS (Institute of Research in Security) at UTA. He is widely recognized for his  contributions to scheduling techniques in parallel and distributed computing systems, and video coding.

Education 
He received his Ph.D. degree in Computer Science and an M.S. degree in Computer Engineering from Syracuse University College of Engineering and Computer Science in 1992 and 1987, respectively; and a B.Sc. degree in Electrical Engineering from the University of Engineering and Technology, Lahore in Pakistan, in 1985. Prior to joining the University of Texas, he was an associate professor of the Computer Science Department at the Hong Kong University of Science and Technology (HKUST). At HKUST, he also directed the university's Multi-media Technology Research Center.

Research  
His research focus is on the broader areas of parallel and distributed computing systems and their applications, optimization algorithms, multimedia systems, video compression, assistive technologies, smart power grid, and energy-aware sustainable computing. His research work is published in 250 articles in books, and peer-reviewed journals and conference proceedings.  Professor Ishfaq Ahmad's current research is funded by the U.S. Department of Justice (DOJ), National Science Foundation (NSF), Department of Education (GAANN Project), Semiconductor Research Corporation (SRC), Adobe Inc., and Texas Instruments.

He is leading several efforts in sustainable computing and computing for sustainability. This includes launching of a new journal with Elsevier, Sustainable Computing: Informatics and Systems (SUSCOM) of which he is the founding editor-in-chief, and launching of the International Green Computing Conference.

Awards 
Professor Ishfaq Ahmad has received numerous international research awards, including several best paper awards at leading conference proceedings and top ranked journals, such as IEEE Circuits and Systems Society – 2007 Circuits and Systems for Video Technology Transactions Best Paper Award, IEEE Service Appreciation Award, and 2008 Outstanding Area Editor Award from the IEEE Transactions on Circuits and Systems for Video Technology. His research work in high-performance computing and video compression is widely cited with over 17,000 citations to his papers. He is listed in Pride of Pakistan, Hall of Fame. He is a Fellow of IEEE.

Other appointments 
In addition to being a full-time professor at the University of Texas at Arlington, he is also

 Visiting scientist at the U.S. Air Force Research Laboratory in Rome, New York   
 Visiting scientist at the Institute of Computing Technology (ICT) in Beijing, China   
 Honorary professor at the University of Electronic Sciences at Chengdu, China   
 Honorary professor at the Amity University in India and UAE  
 Certified ABET (Accreditation Board for Engineering and Technology) evaluator  
 Member of the advisory board for European Commission on Energy Efficiency in Information and Communication Technologies  
 Fellow of the IEEE  
 Distinguished Life Fellow of the IDES (Institute of Doctors, Engineers, and Scientists) of India  
 Member of the supercomputing advisory board for Lifeboat Foundation  
 Founding Editor-in-Chief of the Journal, Sustainable Computing: Informatics and Systems  
 Co-founder of the International Green and Sustainable Computing (IGSC) Conference

In addition, he has served as editor of IEEE Transactions on Parallel and Distributed Systems, IEEE Distributed Systems Online, Journal of Parallel and Distributed Computing, IEEE Transactions on Circuits and Systems for Video Technology, and IEEE Transactions on Multimedia.

Notable publications 

 [BOOK] Handbook of Energy-Aware and Green Computing. Ishfaq Ahmad and Sanjay Ranka, Chapman and Hall/CRC Press, Taylor and Francis Group LLC, Jan. 2012, two volumes, over 1200 pages. 
 [BOOK]  Handbook of Exascale Computing. Sanjay Ranka and Ishfaq Ahmad. Under publication, Chapman and Hall/CRC Press, expected mid-2018.
 Static scheduling algorithms for allocating directed task graphs to multiprocessors. YK Kwok, Ishfaq Ahmad, ACM Computing Surveys 31 (4), 406-471. 
 Dynamic critical-path scheduling: An effective technique for allocating task graphs to multiprocessors. YK Kwok, Ishfaq Ahmad, IEEE transactions on parallel and distributed systems 7 (5), 506-521.     
 Benchmarking and comparison of the task graph scheduling algorithms. YK Kwok, Ishfaq Ahmad, Journal of Parallel and Distributed Computing 59 (3), 381-422.  
 Video transcoding: an overview of various techniques and research issues. Ishfaq  Ahmad, X Wei, Y Sun, YQ Zhang, IEEE Transactions on multimedia 7 (5), 793-804.            
 Power-rate-distortion analysis for wireless video communication under energy constraints. Z He, Y Liang, L Chen, Ishfaq Ahmad, D Wu, IEEE Transactions on Circuits and Systems for Video Technology 15 (5), 645-658.    
 On exploiting task duplication in parallel program scheduling. Ishfaq Ahmad, YK Kwok, IEEE Transactions on Parallel and Distributed Systems 9 (9), 872-892.  
 Optimal task assignment in heterogeneous distributed computing systems. M Kafil, Ishfaq Ahmad, IEEE concurrency 6 (3), 42-50. 
 Efficient scheduling of arbitrary task graphs to multiprocessors using a parallel genetic algorithm. YK Kwok, Ishfaq Ahmad, Journal of Parallel and Distributed Computing 47 (1), 58-77.      
 A cooperative game theoretical technique for joint optimization of energy consumption and response time in computational grids. SU Khan, Ishfaq Ahmad, IEEE Transactions on Parallel and Distributed Systems 20 (3), 346-360.          
 An integrated technique for task matching and scheduling onto distributed heterogeneous computing systems. MK Dhodhi, I Ahmad, A Yatama, I Ahmad, Journal of parallel and distributed computing 62 (9), 1338-1361.    
 Semi-distributed load balancing for massively parallel multicomputer systems. Ishfaq Ahmad, A Ghafoor, IEEE Transactions on Software Engineering 17 (10), 987-1004.          
 A fast adaptive motion estimation algorithm. Ishfaq Ahmad, W Zheng, J Luo, M Liou, IEEE Transactions on circuits and systems for video technology 16 (3), 420-438.

References 

 

Year of birth missing (living people)
Living people
Fellow Members of the IEEE
American computer scientists
American academics of Pakistani descent
Academic journal editors
Pakistani electrical engineers
University of Engineering and Technology, Lahore alumni
Pakistani computer scientists
University of Texas at Arlington faculty
Syracuse University College of Engineering and Computer Science alumni
Government College University, Lahore alumni
Pakistani expatriate academics
Academic staff of the Hong Kong University of Science and Technology
Pakistani emigrants to the United States